Karl Gustaf Magnus Sjöberg (born 26 September 1927) is a Swedish jurist. He served as the Prosecutor-General of Sweden from 1978 to 1989 and as President of the Supreme Administrative Court of Sweden from 1990 to 1994.

Early life
Sjöberg was born on 26 September 1927 in Klinte, Sweden, the son of the Gustaf Sjöberg, a provost, and his wife Elsa (born Kloetzen). He received a Candidate of Law degree from Uppsala University in 1953.

Career
Sjöberg did his clerkship from 1953 to 1956. Sjöberg served as an extra legal clerk (fiskal) in the Svea Court of Appeal in 1956 and tingsrätt secretary in the Nedansiljan Judicial District from 1957 to 1959. Sjöberg was then a judge (rådman) in Visby from 1959 to 1961 and a co-opted member of the Svea Court of Appeal from 1961 to 1962, and became an associate judge there in 1963. He became a hovrättsråd in 1969. He was deputy secretary of the 1st Committee on Civil Law (Första lagutskottet) from 1963 to 1964, and secretary there from 1964 to 1965. Sjöberg was an expert at the Ministry of Justice from 1965 to 1967, and served as acting deputy director-general (departementsråd) in the Prime Minister's Office (Statsrådsberedningen) in 1967. He was then director-general for legal affairs (rättschef) there from 1967 to 1972, Justice of the Supreme Court of Sweden from 1972 to 1978, and Prosecutor-General of Sweden from 1978 to 1989. Sjöberg served as President of the Supreme Administrative Court of Sweden from 1990 to 1994.

Sjöberg was chairman of number boards and associations: Swedish Criminalist Association (Svenska kriminalistföreningen) from 1980 to 1989, the Swedish department of the AIDP from 1981 to 1989, the BONUS association from 1973, the Board of Prison Terms (Kriminalvårdsnämnden) from 1995, the Disciplinary Committee of the Authorized Public Accountants' Association (Föreningen Auktoriserade Revisorers disciplinnämnd) from 1994 and of the Institute for Research in Law History (Stiftelsen Institutet för rättshistorisk forskning) from 1996. Sjöberg became an honorary member of the Gotlands nation at Uppsala University in 1988.

Personal life
In 1953, he married Ragnhild Ljunggren (born 1931), a pharmacist, the daughter of Bengt Ljunggren and Elisabeth (née Wistrand).

Awards and decorations
   H. M. The King's Medal, 12th size gold medal worn around the neck on a chain of gold (silver-gilt) (1993)
   Commander of the Order of the Polar Star (18 November 1971)

References

1927 births
Living people
Swedish jurists
Justices of the Supreme Administrative Court of Sweden
Uppsala University alumni
People from Gotland
20th-century Swedish judges
Commanders of the Order of the Polar Star